Baskery is a Swedish alternative Americana folk rock band, comprising the three sisters Greta, Stella and Sunniva Bondesson.  The band have released four studio albums.

History
The band formed in 2007 as an offshoot of The Slaptones, who featured their father Janåke Bondesson on drums, released two albums (Simplify, 2003, and Amplify, 2004) and toured the United States with The Brian Setzer Orchestra.

Baskery released an EP, One Horse Down, in 2007 on Veranda Independent Records. Their first album, Fall Among Thieves, was recorded with producer Lasse Mårtén using no overdubs and mainly first or second takes, with the aim of capturing as much energy as possible.  It was released in Sweden in May 2008; in Norway, Germany, Austria, Belgium, the Netherlands and Italy in autumn 2008; and in the UK in January 2009.  In 2008 the group toured and played festivals in the United States, Canada, France, Ireland, Denmark and Norway, and toured the UK supporting Seth Lakeman in late 2008.

In 2012 Baskery played gigs throughout the United States and Europe including festivals such as Beautiful Days (festival) and Shrewsbury Folk Festival before heading into the studio in Berlin to start work on recording their third album.

2013 saw the group touring Germany supporting Ina Müller before embarking on their own US tour playing across the country, including The Birchmere in Virginia with Johnny Winter, Four Corners Folk Festival in Colorado and Sisters Folk Festival in Oregon.

Little Wild Life, the third studio album, was released in Sweden in October 2013 before a Europe-wide release in early 2014.

In 2014 the sisters moved from Europe to the US and were based in Nashville, TN until they landed a record deal with Warner Bros. in September 2014, then relocated to Los Angeles, CA. 
Baskery opened up for Robbie Williams on his "Let Me Entertain You Tour" in early 2015 and supported Brandi Carlile later the same year.

2016 / 2017 saw Baskery tour the length and breadth of the US including playing at Bottle Rock, Arroyo Seco, Newport Folk Festival, Bonnaroo, SXSW & Utopia Fest and supporting Gary Clark Jr. on his The Story of Sonny Boy Slim Tour.

In 2018 Baskery embarked on a busy touring schedule across the US, Sweden, Spain, Denmark, Finland and England, opening for Lukas Nelson & Promise of the Real on his German Tour.

The band's fourth studio album Coyote & Sirens was released in 2018 recorded at Glenwood Studios in Burbank, Los Angeles with Andrew Dawson (record producer).

2022 see's Baskery touring extensively including playing Glastonbury Festival for its much welcome return after a 2-year hiatus. New music will see the release of their 5th studio album later in the year.

Style
The group have described their musical style in such terms as "killbilly", "mud-country" and "banjo punk" and they have been compared with The Dixie Chicks, The Roches, Led Zeppelin and Black Rebel Motorcycle Club. Favourable reviews have included descriptions including "absurdly wonderful...[they] do their own thing with a glee which, coupled with no little virtuosity and runaway vivaciousness, is irresistible."  (Colin Irwin, Mojo)

Band members
Greta Bondesson: Guitar banjo / guitars, drums, harmonica, vocals
Stella Bondesson: Double bass, electric bass, vocals
Sunniva Bondesson: Acoustic/electric guitars, cello, vocals

Discography

EPs
 One Horse Down (Veranda Independent Records, 2007)

Albums
 Fall Among Thieves (Glitterhouse Records, released Europe 2008, UK 2009)
 New Friends (Blue Rose Records, released 2011)
 Little Wild Life (mother tarantula rec, released 2013)
 Coyote & Sirens (mother tarantula rec, released 2018)

References

External links

 Band homepage

Musical groups established in 2007
Swedish alternative country groups
Warner Records artists